Hoover John Wright Sr. (July 23, 1928 – March 7, 2003) was an American football and track and field coach.

Football coaching career

Early coaching posts
Wright's coaching career began at Shorter College in North Little Rock, Arkansas.  At Shorter, he was head football coach, men's and women's basketball coach, and track coach.  His next post was at Paul Quinn College where he was the athletic director and head football coach.

Prairie View A&M
Wright served two stints as the head football coach at Prairie View A&M University in Prairie View, Texas, from 1966 to 1968 and 1973 to 1979. His record at Prairie View was 31–68–2.

Track and field

Honors
Wright also found success as a track and field coach at Prairie View.  He was the head coach of the programs for over 40 years and his teams secured two NAIA Indoor titles and one NAIA outdoor title.  In 2005, he was inducted into the USTFCCCA Hall of Fame.  The school has since honored him by naming their annual track meet after his legacy.

He served as the meet referee of the NCAA National Championship track meet in 1987.  He was also placed in the Drake Relays Hall of Fame in 1986 for his excellence as a coach.

Overcoming tragedy
At age 71, Wright was seriously injured during a bus crash on the way to a track meet where four of his athletes were killed and five were seriously injured.  Later that season, Wright was able lead his team to put the tragedy behind them by defending their Southwestern Athletic Conference indoor track championship.

Education and death
Wright earned a bachelor's degree from Maryland State College—now known as University of Maryland Eastern Shore—in 1948 and a master's degree from Pennsylvania State University. He also completed post-graduate work at the University of Iowa and the University of North Texas.

Wright died on March 7, 2003, at his home in Cypress, Texas.

Head coaching record

Football

References

External links
 

1928 births
2003 deaths
American women's basketball coaches
Basketball coaches from Maryland
Paul Quinn Tigers athletic directors
Paul Quinn Tigers football coaches
Prairie View A&M Panthers football coaches
Junior college men's basketball coaches in the United States
College track and field coaches in the United States
University of Maryland Eastern Shore alumni
People from Wicomico County, Maryland
Coaches of American football from Maryland
African-American coaches of American football
20th-century African-American sportspeople
21st-century African-American sportspeople